The Czar of Broadway is a 1930 American pre-Code crime film produced and distributed by Universal Pictures, directed by William James Craft and starring John Wray, Betty Compson, John Harron and Claud Allister.

Synopsis
A young reporter recently arrived from San Francisco is assigned by his new editor to dig up information on corrupt political boss Morton Bradstreet who has proved untouchable by the authorities so far.

Cast
John Wray as Morton Bradstreet
Betty Compson as Connie Cotton
John Harron as Jay Grant the reporter
Claud Allister as Francis
Wilbur Mack as  Harry Foster
 King Baggot a Dane Harper
 Edmund Breese as 	McNab
 Gino Corrado as 	El Dorado Club Headwaiter
 William B. Davidson as 	Club Manager

Preservation status
This film is preserved in the collection of the Library of Congress.

References

External links
The Czar of Broadway, imdb.com 
Film synopsis, allmovie.com
Lobby poster, romecapitol.com
Swedish lobby poster, 3.bp.blogspot.com

1930 films
Films directed by William James Craft
Universal Pictures films
American black-and-white films
Films scored by Heinz Roemheld
American crime drama films
1930 crime drama films
Films set in New York City
1930s English-language films
1930s American films